Hafiz (pl. ḥuffāẓ , f. ḥāfiẓa ), literally meaning "memorizer", depending on the context, is a term used by Muslims for someone who has completely memorized the Quran. Hafiza is the female equivalent.

Although a hafiz does not have formal authority like an aalim or a mufti, in places where the scholars are scarce, they are frequently consulted and often made an imam. Resultantly, a hafiz becomes the leader of his community and the go-to person for religious knowledge, counselling, and other religious disputes.

A hafiz is given great respect by the people of the community with titles such as "Hafiz Sahb" (Sir Hafiz), "Ustadh" (أُسْتَاذ) (Teacher), "Mawlana" (مَوْلَانَا) (Our Master), and occasionally Sheikh (شَيْخ).

Importance 
Hifz is the memorization of the Quran. Muslims believe that whoever memorizes the Quran and acts upon it will be rewarded and honoured greatly by Allah, as Abdullah ibn Amr narrated that the Messenger of Allah said: “It shall be said - meaning to the one who memorized the Qur'an - 'Recite, and rise up, recite (melodiously) as you would recite in the world. Indeed your rank shall be at the last Ayah you recited” (Jami` at-Tirmidhi 2914)

Having memorised the Quran, the hafiz or hafiza must then ensure they do not forget it. To ensure perfect recall of all the learned verses requires constant practice. The memorisation of the Quran was important to Muslims in the past and also in the present. Yearly, thousands of students master the Quran and complete the book with interpretation and also memorisation. The Quran is perhaps the only book, religious or secular, that has been memorized completely by millions of people.

In Pakistan alone, Qari Hafeez Jalandhari, the general secretary of the Wafaq-ul-Madaris, which is a central board accounting for most of the religious seminaries in Pakistan, says that, in its network of madaris, "one million children have become Hafiz-e-Quran after an exam was introduced in 1982", with more than 78,000 (including 14,000 girls) every year, which he compared to the yearly output of Saudi Arabia, which is 5,000.

Cultural differences 
For Muslims who are attempting to memorize certain suras but are unfamiliar with the Arabic script, the ulema have made various elucidations. There are mixed opinions on the usage of romanization of Arabic due to concerns about mispronunciations, higher approval of writing systems with close consonantal and vocalic equivalents to classical Arabic or relevant and effective diacritics, and a preference for Quran tutors or recorded recitations from qaris or any device with clear audible sound storage technology, such as CDs or cassettes.

Keeping the Quran memorized has always been a challenging and, at the same time, important issue in Muslim countries. In Iran, according to Resolution 573 of the Supreme Council of the Cultural Revolution, there is at least one specialized examination of the preservation of the Quran each year, according to specific criteria. The reviewer of this evaluation is Dar al-Qur'an al-Karim, a subsidiary of the Islamic Advertising Organization. According to Article 5 of the above Decree, holders of specialized qualifications for memorizing the Quran will enjoy the benefits of one to five art degrees, subject to the approval of the 547th session of the Supreme Council for Cultural Revolution. Therefore, the approval of the Qualification Degrees 1 to 5 of the Quran are in line with the Doctoral, Master's,  Bachelor, Associate's Diploma and Diploma degrees, respectively.

See also
 Qari'
 Hafez

References

Islamic terminology
Memory in culture